Cross River may refer to:

Places

Canada 
Cross River (British Columbia), a tributary of the Kootenay River

Nigeria 
Cross River (Nigeria)
Cross River gorilla (Gorilla gorilla diehli)
Cross River State, in southeastern Nigeria, named after the above river
Cross River languages, a branch of the Benue-Congo languages subgroup of the Niger-Congo languages

United States 
Cross River (Maine), a tributary of the Sheepscot River
Cross River (Gunflint Lake), a river in Minnesota
Cross River (Lake Superior), a river in Minnesota
Cross River (Little Fork River tributary), a river in Minnesota
Cross River (New York), a tributary of the Croton River
Cross River, New York, a hamlet of Lewisboro, New York

Other uses
Cross River Bank, a community bank based in Fort Lee, New Jersey, US
Cross River Rail, a proposed railway line in Brisbane, Australia

See also
 Cross (disambiguation)